Sami Elopuro (born 22 November 1964) is a Finnish former professional squash player, and national champion. He reached a career high of number 7 in the world. He represented Finland internationally, for example at the World Team Championships. As of 2018, he coaches professional players Jami Äijänen and Miko Äijänen.

References

1964 births
Living people
Finnish male squash players